Ghazalah Alaqouri (born 3 June 1973) in a Libyan powerlifter who competes in the <86 kg class. She competed in the Summer Paralympics in Rio de Janeiro, Brazil in 2016.

Life
She and Sahar Elgnemi qualified for the 2016 Summer Paralympics in Rio de Janeiro, Brazil. They competed for Libya.

References

External links 
 

Living people
Paralympic powerlifters of Libya
Powerlifters at the 2016 Summer Paralympics
Female powerlifters
1973 births